Mirto (licòre/-i de murta in Sardinian, licòr di mortula in Corsican) is a popular liqueur in the Mediterranean islands of Sardinia, Corsica and Capraia.

It is obtained from the myrtle plant through the alcoholic maceration of the berries or a compound of berries and leaves. Myrtle grows freely in Sardinia, where the liqueur was consumed as part of a local niche market, in two varieties: the one with black berries and the other one with the white ones; legend has it that, long ago, Sardinian bandits introduced this particular usage of the plant to the nearby island of Corsica, where the liqueur has also been considered a traditional drink since then.

Varieties 
There are two varieties of myrtle liqueur:
Mirto rosso (simply murta) is made with the berries of the black variety and is sweet.
Mirto bianco (murta arba) is made with the berries of the white variety or, less commonly, from young leaves.

References

Italian liqueurs
Cuisine of Sardinia
Corsican cuisine